Neoplecostomus selenae is a species of armored catfish endemic to Brazil.  This species grows to a length of  SL.

The fish is named in honor of Selena Canhoto Zawadzki, Cláudio Henrique Zawadzki’s daughter.

References
 

selenae
Fish of South America
Fish of Brazil
Endemic fauna of Brazil
Taxa named by Cláudio Henrique Zawadzki
Taxa named by Carla Simone Pavanelli
Taxa named by Francisco Langeani-Neto
Fish described in 2008